Group A of the 1994 Federation Cup Americas Zone was one of four pools in the Americas zone of the 1994 Federation Cup. Four teams competed in a round robin competition, with the top three teams advancing to the knockout stage.

Venezuela vs. Uruguay

Mexico vs. Puerto Rico

Venezuela vs. Puerto Rico

Uruguay vs. Mexico

Venezuela vs. Mexico

Uruguay vs. Puerto Rico

See also
Fed Cup structure

References

External links
 Fed Cup website

1994 Federation Cup Americas Zone